This is the List of caves in Brasil with links displayed alphabetically.

Caves in Brazil

References

Parks
 Parque da Cascata
 Chapada Diamantina National Park

See also
List of caves
Speleology

 
Brazil
Caves